Another Man's Wife may refer to: 

 Another Man's Wife (film), a 1924 American silent film starring Lila Lee and Wallace Beery 
 Another Man's Wife (novel), a 1934 novel by British writer Marie Belloc Lowndes